EQ may refer to:

Arts, entertainment, and media
 Evangelical Quarterly, religious journal
 EverQuest, a fantasy-themed role-playing game first released in 1999

Businesses
 eQ Bank, a Finnish bank
 EQ Bank, a direct banking brand of Canadian lender Equitable Bank
 Embarq (NYSE stock symbol EQ), a local exchange carrier in the United States

Science and technology

Computer science
 Equality (relational operator), used in computer programming for an equality operator
 Equalization (audio), in audio processing

Earth science
 Earthquake
 Equator, in geography

Mathematics
 Equation, in mathematics
 Equivalent (chemistry), a measurement unit used in chemistry

Neuroscience
 Encephalization quotient, a value for the brain to body mass ratio
 Emotional quotient, a capacity to recognize and use emotional information
 Empathy quotient, a psychological self-report measure of empathy

Transportation

Automobiles
 Chery eQ, a 2014–present Chinese electric city car
 Mercedes-Benz EQ, a family of German electric vehicles
 TAME, an airline based in Quito, Ecuador, IATA airline designator EQ

Other

Education
 Education Queensland, part of the Department of Education (Queensland)

Religion and mysticism
 English Qaballa, a system of numerology

Sport
 Equestrianism, a term pertaining to horses or their riders

See also

EQS (disambiguation)

E (disambiguation)
Q (disambiguation)
QE (disambiguation)
 Equals (disambiguation)